Segu may refer to:
Ségou, a city in south-central Mali, the former capital of the Bamana Empire
Sergi López Segú, Spanish footballer
Segu (novel), by Maryse Condé
SEGU, the old ICAO airport code for José Joaquín de Olmedo International Airport, which serves Guayaquil in Ecuador